Steagul Roşu may refer to:

Roman (vehicle manufacturer), a truck and bus manufacturer previously named Steagul Roşu
FC Brașov (1936), a football club previously named Steagul Roşu